is a Japanese multimedia project co-published by Shueisha's Dash X Bunko imprint, Fujimi Shobo's Fujimi Fantasia Bunko imprint, Media Factory's MF Bunko J imprint, Shogakukan's Gagaga Bunko imprint, and Shueisha's Jump Square magazine. The original concept was developed by Marvelous and a three-person unit of writers known as Speakeasy made up of Kōshi Tachibana, Sō Sagara and Wataru Watari. It launched in 2015 with several light novels, and a manga began serialization in Jump Square in 2016. An anime television series, produced by A-1 Pictures and directed by Kenichi Kawamura, aired between July and September 2016.

Plot
The story takes place in a world where humankind is at war against an enemy called the "Unknown". Children who were evacuated to a cold sleep facility during the invasion by the Unknown several decades ago wake up from their slumber and learn that their bodies developed supernatural abilities called "World". In order to protect Japan from the Unknown emerging from the Tokyo Bay gate, the boys and girls wage battles for the defense of the cities in the Kantō region (Tokyo, Yokohama (Kanagawa), and Chiba).

Characters

Main

Ichiya is the protagonist for Sonna Sekai wa Kowashiteshimae. A head student representative from Tokyo. He is a person with high confidence and thinks low of others, but probably due to him having terrible conversation skills. He shows respect to adults as older people have helped him in his childhood. It is hinted that he has romantic feelings toward his childhood friend, Canaria.

Canaria is the student representative from Tokyo and its sub-head. Canaria is Ichiya's childhood best friend who is actually a year older than him, but because she was late a year during the cold sleep, her age is now same as Ichiya. She affectionately calls Ichiya "Icchan". She is the only one whose staff can't fly, which means she has to be carried by other students whenever they engage in battle. She has romantic feelings toward Ichiya and it is hinted that their feelings are mutual.

Asuha is the student representative and head of Chiba, and also Kasumi's younger sister.

Kasumi is the protagonist for Dōdemo Ii Sekai Nante. Student representative and sub-head of Chiba, he is Asuha's older brother whom she calls "Onii". He always has quarrels with Ichiya, although according to his sister this is because "he's only able to talk to people by replying in mean words", which is also why he can't stand Canaria. He usually holds the sniper position.

Maihime is the protagonist for Itsuka Sekai o Sukū Tame ni. Student representative and head of Kanagawa with a carefree and a bit childish personality, but is a good leader. She has godlike powers, but sometimes has no control over them.

Hotaru is the student representative and sub-head of Kanagawa. She dotes and spoils her friend since childhood Maihime, whom she calls "Hime", too much to the point that she can't bear the moment she isn't with Maihime.

Others

Aoi is a student from Kanagawa who is part of the student administration. Her World is the ability to spread anything to a wide area.

Media

Print
There are four Qualidea Code light novel series written by different authors. Shueisha published the first volume on January 23, 2015. Fujimi Shobo has published two volumes between July 18, 2015 and January 20, 2016. Media Factory has published two volumes between October 23, 2015 and June 24, 2016. Shogakukan published the first volume on July 20, 2016. A light novel adaptation of the anime series was published on August 25, 2016. A manga adaptation illustrated by Risō Maeda began serialization in Shueisha's Jump Square magazine in December 2016.

Anime
A 12-episode anime television series, produced by A-1 Pictures and directed by Kenichi Kawamura, aired between July 10 and September 24, 2016. The series was also streamed by Crunchyroll. The screenplay is written by a three-person unit of writers known as Speakeasy composed of Kōshi Tachibana, Sō Sagara and Wataru Watari. Hisayuki Tabata based the character design used in the anime on Matsuryu's original design. The music is composed by Taku Iwasaki. The first opening theme for episodes 2 to 8 is "Brave Freak Out" and the second opening theme for episodes 9 to 12 is "AxxxiS", both sung by LiSA. The series will be released on six BD and DVD compilation volumes between September 21, 2016 and February 22, 2017. The anime features all of the main characters from the three light novel series Itsuka Sekai o Sukū Tame ni, Sonna Sekai wa Kowashiteshimae, and Dōdemo Ii Sekai Nante.

Reception
Anime News Network (ANN) had four editors review the first episode of the anime: Paul Jensen and Nick Creamer gave similar praise and criticism to the battle sequences and cast of generic archetypes, with the former noting how the episode has a sense of humor about its given genre and the latter commending the writers for not rushing things to explain the series' universe through lengthy exposition or interpersonal character melodrama; Theron Martin praised the character interactions, setting and action scenes for having decent value to them but wanted to know more about the cast besides Ichiya and the direction being taken for the overall plot moving forward. The fourth reviewer, Rebecca Silverman, was critical of the story execution throughout the episode and the main cast having little in the way of engaging character traits or motivation for the viewers to care about them. Fellow ANN editor James Beckett reviewed the complete anime series in 2017. Despite giving praise to Mahime and Hotaru's arc in the middle third being fairly interesting and the workmanlike character designs, he criticized the series for its poorly planned execution of the plot towards the final third, underwritten characters lacking in engaging arcs and the technical aspects being only adequate at best, saying "[I]t isn't a terrible show, but it's about as unremarkable as an anime can be."

Notes

References

External links
  
 Novel websites:
 Kuzu to Kinka no Qualidea 
 Itsuka Sekai o Sukū Tame ni: Qualidea Code 
 Sonna Sekai wa Kowashiteshimae: Qualidea Code 
 Dōdemo Ii Sekai Nante: Qualidea Code 
 

2015 Japanese novels
2016 Japanese novels
A-1 Pictures
Action anime and manga
Anime and manga about parallel universes
Dash X Bunko
Fujimi Fantasia Bunko
Gagaga Bunko
Kadokawa Dwango franchises
Light novels
MF Bunko J
Fiction about robots
Robots in television
School life in anime and manga
Science fiction anime and manga
Shogakukan franchises
Shōnen manga
Shueisha books
Supernatural anime and manga
Television shows based on light novels
Television series set in the future
Television shows set in Tokyo
Tokyo MX original programming